The Government College of Arts & Science (also called Kamarajar Government College) is a college in Surandai, India. It was founded in 2008 for the students who live in Tamil Nadu.

Departments available here

1) Tamil 
2) English 
3) Mathematics
4) Physics
5) Chemistry
6) Microbiology
7) Commerce
8) Economics
9) Electronics and Communication

References

Education in Tirunelveli district
Educational institutions established in 2008
2008 establishments in Tamil Nadu
Colleges affiliated to Manonmaniam Sundaranar University
Universities and colleges in Tirunelveli district